The following is a list of awards and nominations received by English film director, producer, screenwriter and theatre director Danny Boyle.

Awards and nominations

Academy Awards

BAFTA Awards

Empire Awards

Golden Globe Awards

Independent Spirit Awards

Primetime Emmy Awards

Satellite Awards

Film critic awards

Miscellaneous awards

References

 

 

Lists of awards received by film director